The Monteith Formation is a geologic formation of Early Cretaceous (Valanginian) age in the Western Canada Sedimentary Basin that consists primarily of sandstone. It is present in the northern foothills of the Canadian Rockies and the adjacent plains in northeastern British Columbia and west-central Alberta.

Lithology
The Monteith Formation consists primarily of fine-grained argillaceous sandstone with interbeds of siltstone, dark grey mudstone, shale, and minor coal beds. Coarser-grained quartzose sandstones and minor quartz-pebble and chert conglomerates are present in some areas.

Environment of deposition
The Monteith Formation was deposited in marine and nonmarine environments within and adjacent to the Western Interior Seaway. Depositional settings ranged from marine to shoreline, deltaic, river channel, floodplain, and swamp environments.

Paleontology and age
The age of the Monach Formation formations has been determined from its fossil fauna, primarily species of the bivalve Buchia.

Thickness and distribution
The Monteith Formation is present in the foothills of the Canadian Rockies and the adjacent plains from the Prophet River in northeastern British Columbia to the Berland River in west-central Alberta.

Relationship to other units
The Monteith Formation is the basal formation of the Minnes Group. It was deposited conformably over the marine shales of the Fernie Formation and is conformably overlain by the Beattie Peaks Formation. To the south it grades into the Nikanassin Formation.

References

See also

 
 List of fossiliferous stratigraphic units in British Columbia

Valanginian Stage
Cretaceous British Columbia
Stratigraphy of British Columbia
Cretaceous Alberta